Lee Russell (born 1970) is an English record producer and musician.

Lee has produced records for artists including: 

 Kate Walsh
 Ezio
 Melanie Blatt
 Paul Carrack
 Dirk Darmstaedter
 John Butler (Diesel Park West)
 Nada Surf
 The Moons
 Liam Dullaghan
 Cheryl Cole
 My First Tooth
 Sukie
 Thrulk
 Birthday Sex
 Reuben Hollebon

Lee currently works mostly from his private recording studio (a converted chapel in the Northamptonshire countryside).

External links
 Dulcitone.com

1970 births
Living people
English record producers